The Twenty-Eighth Canadian Ministry was the Cabinet, chaired by Prime Minister Stephen Harper, that governed Canada from the beginning of the 39th Parliament to the end of the 41st Parliament. Its original members were sworn into the Queen's Privy Council for Canada on February 6, 2006, exactly two weeks after the 2006 federal election and nine weeks and six days after the end of the 38th Canadian Parliament. Smaller than its recent predecessors, the Conservative Cabinet originally consisted of 27 members, including the Prime Minister. On January 4, 2007, five Secretaries of State were added to the ministry who are not members of the Cabinet itself. The cabinet resigned on the morning of November 4, 2015.

Only 24 of the original members were elected to serve as Conservative Members of Parliament (MP) in 2006; Senator Marjory LeBreton is the Leader of the Government in the Senate. The other two choices that raised some controversy were David Emerson, who was elected as a Liberal, but crossed the floor between the election and the swearing-in of the Cabinet to serve as Minister of International Trade, of the Pacific Gateway, and of the Vancouver-Whistler Olympics, and Michael Fortier, a Montreal-area member of the former Progressive Conservatives and co-chair of the Conservatives' 2006 federal campaign, who was not elected as an MP but was named a Senator on February 27, 2006, and subsequently served as Minister of Public Works and Government Services.

The reason given for the appointments of Emerson and Fortier was that the Conservatives were completely shut out of the three most populous cities in Canada – Montreal, Toronto, and Vancouver. The Liberals were the only party to win seats in all three, with the Bloc represented in Montreal and the NDP in Toronto and Vancouver. Emerson's riding is Vancouver Kingsway, and Fortier lives and works in the Montreal-Laval area, and ran for the riding of Laval West for the Tories in 2000. The only major city this left out was Toronto, although the Conservatives have indicated that they consider that enough Cabinet Ministers are from the Greater Toronto Area, including Jim Flaherty and Bev Oda, to adequately represent the city in Cabinet.

Contrary to precedent, Harper did not name a Deputy Prime Minister, confounding rumours that Quebec lieutenant Lawrence Cannon or Conservative deputy leader Peter MacKay might be awarded the honorary post. Harper's explanation was that, instead, any replacement Prime Minister would be named as required and this assignment could be conferred upon different ministers.

List of ministers

By minister
Note: This is in Order of Precedence, which is established by the chronological order of appointment to the Queen's Privy Council for Canada, then in order of election or appointment to parliament for ministers who joined the Privy Council on the same day.

1 Styled as Minister of Indian Affairs and Northern Development until May 18, 2011

By portfolio

Earlier ministers

See also

2008–2009 Canadian parliamentary dispute

References

Succession 

2006 establishments in Canada
2015 disestablishments in Canada
28
Ministries of Elizabeth II
39th Canadian Parliament
40th Canadian Parliament
41st Canadian Parliament
Cabinets established in 2006
Cabinets disestablished in 2015